Robert Kotler,M.D. FACS, born in 1942, is an American ear, nose, and throat surgeon. He has performed more than 10,000 major cosmetic procedures during over 30 years in private practice and was a featured surgeon in the first season of the E! cosmetic surgery series Dr. 90210.

Biography
Dr. Kotler attended the University of Wisconsin and Northwestern University Medical School. His specialty training, exclusively in face, head and neck surgery, was at Cook County Hospital, Northwestern University and the University of Illinois.

Major Kotler was chief of head and neck surgery at the DeWitt Army Community Hospital in Fort Belvoir, Va., and a consultant and residency program instructor at the Walter Reed Army Medical Center during his service in the U.S. Army Medical Corps.

In addition to his private practice, the Cosmetic Surgery Specialists Medical Group of Beverly Hills, he is a clinical instructor in the division of head and neck surgery at the Keck School of Medicine of USC. He is a consultant and attending surgeon at the Veterans' Administration Medical Center in West Los Angeles. Kotler has served as a commissioner and regional consultant to the Medical Board of California and as a Medical Consultant to the City and County of Los Angeles.

As a spokesperson for cosmetic surgeons, he regularly appears on radio and television, including ABC, CBS, NBC, CNN and Fox News; on such shows as Oprah, Deborah Norville Tonight, The Daily Show with Jon Stewart, Your World with Neil Cavuto, EXTRA, Entertainment Tonight and Access Hollywood. He has also been interviewed in most leading magazines and newspapers.

Most recently, Dr. Kotler has been featured as the "go to" cosmetic surgeon on WebMD.

Professional Positions Held

 Activities – Past & Present
 Private Practice Limited to Cosmetic Surgery of the Face, Head & Neck. 1977–present
 Clinical Instructor, Department of Surgery, Division of Head and Neck Surgery, U.C.L.A. Center for the Health Sciences.  1977–present
 Attending Surgeon, Division of Head and Neck Surgery,Veteran's Administration Medical Center, Los Angeles, California.   1977–present
 Former Commissioner and Regional Consultant, Medical Board of California.  1997- 2005
 Founder and President, American Nasal and Facial Surgery Institute, Inc.  1980  -1985
 Former Head and Neck Section Chairman, American Society of Outpatient Surgeons. 1984-1986
 Former Consultant, Medical Department, County of Los Angeles. 1980- 1990
 Former Consultant, Medical Department, City of Los Angeles. 1980- 1990

Published Books
The Consumer's Guidebook to Cosmetic Facial Surgery (Ernest Mitchell, 1990)
Chemical Rejuvenation of the Face (Mosby Year Book, 1992)
Secrets of a Beverl Hills Cosmetic Surgeon (Ernest Mitchell, 2003)
The Essential Cosmetic Surgery Companion (Ernest Mitchell, 2005)

Selected articles

Alonso-Zaldivar,Ricardo. "Cosmetic surgery business sags as purse strings tighten." Los Angeles Times. 5 April 2008. Tribune Interactive, Inc.
Rouen, Ethan. "Vacationing for New You." AmericanWay Magazine. 15 February 2010.The Magazine of American Airlines.
Robert Kotler, MD FACS. "Rhinoplasty Upscaled: What more can we do to improve the rate of successful outcomes? Plenty." Plastic Surgery Products. February 2011.<Allied Media, Inc.
Smith, Rich. "Patient Satisfaction is Key." Plastic Surgery Times. January, 2009. Allied Media.
Hilton, Lisette. "The Written Word. Cosmetic Surgery Books are an important part of patient education." Modern Medicine, 1 August 2006. Advanstar Communications, Inc.
Springen, Karen. "Kids Under the Knife." Newsweek. 31 October 2004
Kotler, Robert, MD FACS. "What You Should Know about Face-Lifts." Bottom Line Personal. 15 April 2004. Bottom Line Publications.
Nash, Karen. "Rhinoplasty for teens offers functional, aesthetic satisfaction." Modern Medicine. 1 September 2001. Advanstar Communications, Inc.
Lawrence S. Moy, M.D.; Robert Kotler, M.D. "The Histologic Evaluation of Pulsed Carbon Dioxide Laser Resurfacing versus Phenol Chemical Peels in Vivo." Dermatologic Surgery, 25(8):597–600. August, 1999.

References

External links
http://www.robertkotlermd.com/

1942 births
Living people
American plastic surgeons
Feinberg School of Medicine alumni
University of Wisconsin–Madison alumni
University of Southern California faculty
United States Army Medical Corps officers